Terrence Michael Walsh (6 November 1953 – 9 August 1987) was a singer, song writer and musician. Born in Liverpool, England and migrated to Sydney with his mother and father in early 1962. He is best known as Johnny Dole, lead singer and one of the founding members of the Sydney Punk Rock band Johnny Dole & The Scabs (1977–78).

Early life
Growing up in the Sydney suburb of Marrickville and coming from a family with a background in entertainment including his grandmother, Elsie Brown who was a vaudevillian style banjo player/entertainer and his father who was also a singer and dancer it was inevitable Walsh would follow in their footsteps.

His mother Betty, affectionately known as "Vicki" would take him to many talent quests encouraging him to be as good as he could and his singing was improving all the time. By the age of 14 Walsh had sent away for his first "mail order" guitar from the Melody School of Music. Enlisting the services of guitar teacher Lynton Bridge of Campsie and with lots of hard work he was soon playing like a pro.

The 70s

During the early 70s Walsh sang and performed in many Sydney bands including, Eddy Halley & The Starliters featuring Tony Haley. On Walsh's suggestion they changed their name to Eddy Holly and Sirikit. They were a 50s revival band doing recreations of 50s artists such as Elvis Presley, Buddy Holly and Eddie Cochran, who were some of Walsh's heroes. During his time with Eddy Holly and Sirikit he was using the stage name Mike Walsh, to cash in on the TV host of the same name. In 1975 he formed The Strays who would slowly morph into Johnny Dole & The Scabs by 1977.

With Punk Rock quickly emerging from overseas The Strays realised they were in fact a Punk Rock band. Needing a new name to go along with this new form of music Walsh took on the surname Dole (an Australian slang word for unemployment payments from the government) which was something any good Punk Rocker should be on. Johnny is a very typical name from the 50s era, there were many Rockers using the name Johnny, one being Johnny O'Keefe another of his idols so Johnny Dole was born.

Return To England
After the breakup of Johnny Dole & The Scabs in 1978, he returned to England, where the punk scene was in full swing, in the hope of forming a new band, The Crooked Hearts, with Bob Short ex Filth bass player and Peter Mullany ex Johnny Dole & The Scabs guitarist, but his increasing use of drugs was becoming a problem, and The Crooked Hearts soon disbanded. Mullany himself would soon return to Australia and form the band Sekret Sekret with friends David Virgin and Dan Rumor, who would then go on to form The Cruel Sea with Tex Perkins.

Death

Walsh returned to Australia in 1979 and formed a number of short-lived bands, including The Shakers and Switchblade. But by 1983 his drug use was now out of control, and he could no longer perform. With a continuing decline in his health, he died alone in a rented room in Darlinghurst, where his body was not found for five or six days after he had died 9 August 1987, aged 33, official cause of death, accidental overdose.

References
 Clinton Walker. Inner City Sound, Wild & Woolley Pty Ltd, 1982. .
 A Close Shave In Railway Square The Sydney Morning Herald – 21 June 2008
 Johnny Dole and the Scabs: Apparently, Punks want to get Drunk Punk Muzic – 20 November 2010

External links
 Greg Morris' Tribute To Johnny Dole
 Film clip on YouTube: 'Aggro' (Walsh/Mullany)
 Australian Music History
 Distorted: Reflections on Early Sydney Punk
 Tony Haley

1953 births
1987 deaths
Australian singer-songwriters
Australian rock singers
20th-century Australian male singers
British emigrants to Australia